Bnetweled is a 1979 studio album by Mohamed Mounir.

Track listing

"Bnetweled" - 6:09
"Selya"(Ahmed Mounib Cover) - 2:01
"So'al"(Ahmed Mounib Cover) - 4:51
"Saheret Layali"(Ahmed Mounib Cover)
"Medy Edek" - 3:03
"Helly Dafyrik" - 3:25
"Ya Aroset El Nile"(Ahmed Mounib Cover) - 3:58
"Eftah Zorar Amesy" - 3:47
"Ghareeba" - 3:18
"Akalem El Amar" - 4:47

External links 
 Mohamed Mounir official website

1979 albums
Mohamed Mounir albums